Thomas Sandberg  (born November 2, 1967) is a Danish composer.

See also
List of Danish composers

References
Official Website 
Thomas Sandberg at Danish Performing Arts Website 
Thomas Sandberg at Danish Music Infos Website

Danish composers
Male composers
1967 births
Living people
Place of birth missing (living people)